John Hargrove may refer to:

John R. Hargrove Sr. (1923–1997), first African-American appointed assistant US Attorney for District of Maryland
John R. Hargrove (attorney) (born 1947), American litigator 
John Hargrove (born 1948), co-owner of the Columbus Lions indoor football team
John Hargrove (orca trainer) (born 1973), American trainer of killer whales

See also
John Hardgrove (1836–1928), member of the Wisconsin State Assembly
John Hargrave (disambiguation)
John Hargreaves (disambiguation)
Hargrove (surname)